Aspen View Public School Division No. 78 or Aspen View Schools is a public school authority within the Canadian province of Alberta operated out of Athabasca.

See also 
List of school authorities in Alberta

References

External links 

 
Athabasca, Alberta
School districts in Alberta